Nesoryzomys indefessus, also known as the Santa Cruz nesoryzomys or Indefatigable Galápagos mouse, is a rodent of the genus Nesoryzomys of family Cricetidae from Galápagos Islands of Ecuador. It formerly lived on Santa Cruz Island, but is now extinct, probably due to the introduction of black rats. Another related rodent, N. narboroughi, is sometimes considered to be a subspecies of N. indefessus.

Etymology
Its specific name is Latin for "unwearied, indefatigable", but the species was named after its island, which was formerly known as "Indefatigable Island" after a ship with the same name.

References

Literature cited
Musser, G.G. and Carleton, M.D. 2005. Superfamily Muroidea. Pp. 894–1531 in Wilson, D.E. and Reeder, D.M. (eds.). Mammal Species of the World: a taxonomic and geographic reference. 3rd ed. Baltimore: The Johns Hopkins University Press, 2 vols., 2142 pp. 

Nesoryzomys
Extinct rodents
Extinct mammals of South America
Endemic fauna of the Galápagos Islands
Rodent extinctions since 1500
Taxa named by Oldfield Thomas
Species made extinct by human activities
Mammals described in 1899